Neocollyris brancuccii is a species of ground beetle in the genus Neocollyris in the family Carabidae. It was described by Naviaux in 1992.

References

Brancuccii, Neocollyris
Beetles described in 1992